Polk Township is a township in Nodaway County, in the U.S. state of Missouri.

Polk Township was erected in 1845. and named after President James K. Polk.

References

Townships in Missouri
Townships in Nodaway County, Missouri